Prionychus is a genus of beetles belonging to the family Tenebrionidae.

The species of this genus are found in Europe.

Species:
 Prionychus asiatica Fairmaire, 1892 
 Prionychus ater (Fabricius, 1775)

References

Tenebrionidae